RareNoiseRecords is an independent record label based in London, co-founded by Italian entrepreneur Giacomo Bruzzo and Italian musician and producer Eraldo Bernocchi in 2008. The label's mission is to detect and amplify contemporary trends in progressive music, by highlighting their relation to the history of the art-form, while choosing not to be bound by pre-conceptions of genre. It seeks to become a guiding light for all those enamored by exciting, adventurous and progressive sounds. In 2020, Bruzzo described his preferences in music for the label: "I like music that gives me a sense of vertigo, like I'm half a second away from the cliff's edge".

The label released its first albums in 2009. Musicians who have worked frequently with RareNoise include Eraldo Bernocchi, Lorenzo Feliciati, Lorenzo Esposito Fornasari, Colin Edwin, Cuong Vu, Jamie Saft, Bill Laswell, Joe Morris, Balázs Pándi, Roy Powell, and Pat Mastelotto. RareNoise offers a subscription service, allowing customers to pay for one year's releases in advance.

Artists

References

External links
RareNoiseRecords official site
RareNoiseRecords on YouTube

7 Questions for... RareNoiseRecords on A Jazz Noise
Freewheelin’ with Giacomo Bruzzo on Jazz da Gama
AMN Interviews: Giacomo Bruzzo of Rare Noise Records on AMN
A Desire to Surprise :The RareNoise Interview on Exposé

British independent record labels
Experimental music record labels
Jazz record labels
Record labels based in London
Record labels established in 2008